Kwabena Joseph "Joetex" Asamoah Frimpong (born 17 April 1982) is a Ghanaian former professional footballer who played as a striker.

Club career
Frimpong was born in Mampong. He began his career in Nigeria with Gabros of Nnewi and El-Kanemi, where he became top scorer and earned a move to Enyimba F.C. He won the CAF African Champions League with Enyimba in 2003 and 2004, scoring a total of 14 goals, but he missed the 2005 competition through injury.

He signed on loan for Saudi Arabian side Al-Nasr on 3 February 2006, with an option to make the deal permanent. He left the club on 7 April 2006, scoring three goals in ten appearances.

Frimpong signed for CS Sfaxien of Tunisia later in 2006, and made an immediate impact in the group stages of the CAF Champions League. He scored a vital goal in the first-leg of the final

In November 2006, Frimpong expressed a desire for a move to Europe and on 16 February 2007 his wish was granted, after he signed a three-year deal with Swiss Premier side BSC Young Boys. He made his league debut for the club on 25 February 2007, in a 3–1 victory over FC Thun; Frimpong celebrated his debut with two goals.

In September 2007, Frimpong was handed a four-match ban and given a fine of 1,100 US dollars after assaulting St. Gallen player Jürgen Gjasula during a league match. The Swiss FA decided not to give him the maximum six match ban after video evidence showed that he was provoked by Gjasula.

On 6 September 2008, he was loaned to FC Luzern.

International career
Frimpong was initially invited to the Nigerian U-23 side, but was dropped when the coach was informed of his true nationality.

Frimpong was a member of the Ghana Squad that played in the 2006 African Cup of Nations. He was however not selected into the Ghana Squad that played in the 2006 FIFA World Cup, having spent a large part of last year out injured and then failing to shine at the year's 2006 African Cup of Nations in Egypt.

On 7 February 2007, Joetex continued his excellent performances at the International level by scoring his 1st goal for Ghana in their 4–1 victory over Nigeria in London

Frimpong Football Academy
He is the founder and chairman of the Football talents company Frimpong Football Academy (since 2010), which is based in Minna.

Honours
Enyimba
 African Champions League: 2003, 2004
 2x Nigerian Professional Football League
 Nigerian Cup: 2005

CS Sfaxien
 Tunisian Cup: 2006

References

External links
 MTN CAF African Champions League Profile
http://www.football.ch/sfl/777818/de/Kader.aspx?pId=731725
 
 

1982 births
Living people
Ghanaian footballers
Ghanaian expatriate footballers
Ghana international footballers
2006 Africa Cup of Nations players
Association football forwards
Swiss Super League players
Nigeria Professional Football League players
Saudi Professional League players
Niger Tornadoes F.C. players
Katsina United F.C. players
Ifeanyi Ubah F.C. players
El-Kanemi Warriors F.C. players
Enyimba F.C. players
Al Nassr FC players
CS Sfaxien players
BSC Young Boys players
FC Luzern players
FC Grenchen players
FC Zürich players
Ghanaian expatriate sportspeople in Nigeria
Expatriate footballers in Nigeria
Ghanaian expatriate sportspeople in Switzerland
Expatriate footballers in Switzerland
Ghanaian expatriate sportspeople in Tunisia
Expatriate footballers in Saudi Arabia